Thomas Gerard Williams (born 1957) is an Irish former hurler. At club level he played with Kilruane MacDonaghs and was also a member of the Tipperary senior hurling team.

Career

Williams first played hurling and Gaelic football at juvenile and underage levels with the Kilruane MacDonaghs club. He was part of the club's under-21 hurling team that won four consecutive Tipperary Under-21AHC, while he also won a Tipperary U21AFC title. Williams eventually progressed onto the club's senior team and was at right wing-forward on the Kilruane MacDonaghs team that won the All-Ireland Club Championship title in 1986.

At inter-county level, Williams never played at minor or under-21 levels. His performances at club level earned a call-up to the senior team in 1986. Williams claimed his first inter-county silverware following the 1987 Munster final replay defeat of Cork.

Honours

Kilruane MacDonaghs
All-Ireland Senior Club Hurling Championship: 1986
Munster Senior Club Hurling Championship: 1985
Tipperary Senior Hurling Championship: 1977, 1978, 1979, 1985
Tipperary Junior A Hurling Championship: 1978

Tipperary
Munster Senior Hurling Championship: 1987

References

External link

 Ger Williams player profile

1957 births
Living people
Kilruane MacDonaghs hurlers
Kilruane MacDonaghs Gaelic footballers
Tipperary inter-county hurlers